Lisa Merchant is a Canadian comic improviser and actress. She played Brenda Murphy on Train 48, and appeared on Improv Heaven and Hell. 
She has won three Canadian Comedy Awards for Best Female Improviser (in 2001, 2003 & 2005).

Alongside Paul O'Sullivan, Debra McGrath, Rebecca Northan and Peter Oldring, she received a Gemini Award nomination for Ensemble Performance in a Comedy Program or Series at the 19th Gemini Awards in 2004 for The Joe Blow Show.

References

External links
 

Canadian television actresses
Canadian women comedians
Living people
Year of birth missing (living people)
Canadian Comedy Award winners